This is a list of women writers who were born in Russia or whose writings are closely associated with that country.

A
Bella Akhmadulina (1937–2010), poet, short story writer, translator
Anna Akhmatova (1899–1966), acclaimed poet, author of Requiem
Elizaveta Akhmatova (1820–1904), "Leila" published a journal for 30 years with translations of English and French writers
Elena Akselrod (born 1932), Belarus-born Russian poet, translator
Ogdo Aksyonova (1936–1995), poet, short story writer, founder of Dolgan written literature
Margarita Aliger (1915–1992), poet, essayist, journalist
Svetlana Alliluyeva (1926–2011), daughter of Joseph Stalin, memoirist, biographer, author of Twenty Letters to a Friend
Al Altaev (1852–1959), writer for children
Tatyana Alyoshina (born 1961), singer-songwriter, poet, short story writer
Lou Andreas-Salomé (1861–1937), psychoanalyst, memoirist, literary essayist, novelist, often writing in German
Domna Anisimova (19th century), poet
Nina Pávlovna Annenkova-Bernár (1859/64–1933) actress, writer, playwright
Varvara Annenkova (1795–1866), prominent poet
Alexandra Nikitichna Annenskaya (1840–1915), translator and writer of feminist novels
Olga Anstei (1912–1985), writer about the Holocaust
Alexandra Nikitichna Annenskaya
Elena Ivanovna Apréleva (1846–1923), non-fiction writer, short story writer, memoirist, playwright, children's writer
Maria Arbatova (born 1957), novelist, playwright, poet, journalist, feminist
Olga Arefieva (born 1966), singer-songwriter, poet, musician
Yekaterina Avdeyeva (1788–1865), non-fiction writer

B
Anna Barkova (1901–1976), poet, journalist, playwright, essayist, memoirist, novelist
Anna Barykova (1839-1893), poet, satirist and translator
Agniya Barto (1906–1981), poet, children's writer, screenwriter
Olga Mihaylovna Bebutova (1879–1952), actress, novelist, magazine editor
Maria Belakhova (1903–1969), children's writer, magazine editor, educator 
Katerina Belkina (born 1974), photographer, painter
Nina Berberova (1901–1993), short story writer, novelist, biographer, author of the autobiography The Italics are Mine
Lydia Yudifovna Berdyaev (1871–1945), poet
Olga Bergholz (1910–1975), poet, playwright, journalist
Antonina Bludova (1813–1891), salonist, memoirist 
Natella Boltyanskaya (born 1965), songwriter, poet, radio host
Marina Boroditskaya (born 1954), poet, children's writer, translator
Vera Broido (1907–2004), memoirist, non-fiction writer, autobiographer
Anna Bunina (1774–1829), poet, first Russian women to earn a living from writing

C
Lidia Charskaya (1875–1938), novelist, works recently revived
Svetlana Chervonnaya (born 1948), historian, non-fiction writer, essayist 
Elena Chudinova (born 1959), novelist, poet, playwright, columnist 
Lydia Chukovskaya (1907–1996), novelist, author of Sofia Petrovna

D
Tatyana Danilyants (born 1971), film director, photographer, poet
Hadiya Davletshina (1905–1954), Baskir poet, prose writer, playwright
Irina Denezhkina (born 1981), short story writer
Marina Denikina (1919–2005), Russian-born French historical novelist, journalist
Regina Derieva (1949–2013), widely translated poet, essayist
Valentina Dmitryeva (1859–1947), short story writer, children's writer, autobiographer
Aliona Doletskaya (born 1955), journalist, editor, television host, translator
Veronika Dolina (born 1956), poet, songwriter
Darya Dontsova (born 1952), best selling crime-fiction novelist, autobiographer
Anna Dostoyevskaya (1846–1918), memoirist, biographer
Lyubov Dostoyevskaya (1869–1926), biographer of Dostoyevsky, memoirist, short story writer, novelist
Yulia Drunina (1924–1991), poet
Svetlana Druzhinina (born 1935), actress, screenwriter, film director
Miroslava Duma (born 1985), fashion writer, magazine editor

E
Tamara Eidelman, contemporary historian, translator, contributor to Russian Life 
Roza Eldarova (1923–2021), journalist, memoirist, politician

F
Elena Fanailova (born 1962), journalist, poet, columnist, translator
Dorothea de Ficquelmont (1804–1863), diarist (in French), letter writer
Vera Figner (1852–1942), revolutionary memoirist, biographer, columnist
Olga Forsh (1873–1961), novelist, playwright, memoirist
Elena Frolova (born 1969), singer-songwriter, poet

G
Cherubina de Gabriak, pen name of Elisaveta Ivanovna Dmitrieva (1887–1928), poet, translator
Nina Gagen-Torn (1900–1986), poet, short story writer, historian
Nora Gal (1912–1991), critic, essayist, prominent translator
Alisa Ganieva (born 1985), pen name Gulla Khirachev, novelist, short story writer, essayist
Tatiana Garmash-Roffe (born 1959), novelist, short story writer, detective story writer
Liudmila Gatagova, historian, since c.1993 several historical works
Vera Gedroitz (1870–1932), medical doctor, poet
Marina Gershenovich (born 1960), poet, translator
Masha Gessen (born 1967), journalist, columnist, biographer, writing in Russian and English 
Lidiya Ginzburg (1902–1990), critic, historian, memoirist
Yevgenia Ginzburg (1904–1977), educator, journalist, historian, memoirist
Zinaida Gippius (1869–1945), modernist poet, novelist, playwright, short story writer, translator, several works translated into English 
Maria Golovnina (c.1980–2015), journalist, Reuters bureau chief for Afghanistan and Pakistan
Natalya Gorbanevskaya (1936–2013), poet, translator
Nina Gorlanova (born 1947), short story writer, novelist
Anastasia Gosteva (born 1975), novelist, short story writer, poet, journalist
Isabella Grinevskaya (1864–1944), novelist, playwright 
Olga Grushin (born 1971), Russian-American novelist, translator  
Elena Guro (1877–1913), playwright, poet, novelist, artist

I
Vera Inber (1890–1972), poet, essayist, translator
Aleksandra Ishimova (1805–1881), children's writer, translator
Nina Iskrenko (1951–1995), poet
Lidiya Ivanova (1936–2007), journalist, television presenter
Praskovya Ivanovskaya (1852–1935), revolutionary, memoirist

J
Nadezhda Joffe (1906–1999), memoirist, biographer

K
Vera Kamsha (born 1962), Ukrainian-born Russian journalist, fantasy novelist
Anna Kashina, Russian-American novelist, completed The Princess of Dhagabad in 2000 
Rimma Kazakova (1932–2008), poet, popular songwriter
Elena Kazantseva (born 1956), Belarusian-born Russian poet, songwriter
Eufrosinia Kersnovskaya (1908–1994), Gulag memoirist 
Nadezhda Khvoshchinskaya (1824–1889), novelist, poet, critic, translator
Marusya Klimova (born 1961), prominent non-fiction writer, literary historian, translator
Ekaterina Kniazhnina (1746–1797), poet, salonist, considered by some to be the first Russian woman writer
Alexandra Kollontai (1872–1952), politician, writer
Ina Konstantinova [1924–1944), wartime diarist 
Sofia Kovalevskaya (1859–1891), mathematician, non-fiction writer
Nadezhda Kozhevnikova (born 1949), journalist, essayist
Zoya Krakhmalnikova (1929–2008), dissident journalist, autobiographer
Olga Kryuchkova (born 1966), historical novelist

L
Nadezhda Lappo-Danilevsky (1874–1951), poet, novelist
Anna Larina (1914–1996), memoirist
Yulia Latynina (born 1966), journalist, novelist, television presenter
Marina Lesko, since 1992, journalist, columnist 
Sonya Levien (1888–1960), screenwriter
Olga Lipovskaya (1954–2021), poet, magazine editor, feminist
Mirra Lokhvitskaya (1869–1905), acclaimed poet
Nina Lugovskaya (1918–1993), Gulag diarist

M
Yelena Maglevannaya (born 1981), journalist
Natalia Malakhovskaia (born 1947), feminist writer
Tatiana Mamonova (born 1943), poet, journalist, feminist
Nadezhda Mandelstam (1899–1980), memoirist, biographer
Anna Margolin (1887–1952), Russian-American Yiddish-language poet
Alexandra Marinina (born 1957), best selling crime fiction novelist, works widely translated
Maria Markova (born 1982), poet
Novella Matveyeva (1934–2016), poet, songwriter, screenwriter, playwright
Olga Martynova (born 1962), poet, essayist, writing in Russian and German
Larisa Matros (born 1938), sociologist, novelist, short story writer, critic, poet
Novella Matveyeva (1934–2016), poet, screenwriter, dramatist, singer-songwriter
Vera Matveyeva (1945–1976), poet, singer-songwriter
Ida Mett (1901–1973), historical writer, magazine editor
Elena Milashina (born 1978), investigative journalist
Maria Moravskaya (1890–1947), poet, essayist, critic, translator
Yunna Morits (born 1937), poet, translator, short story writer, children's writer
Margarita Morozova (1873–1958), publisher, memoirist
Tatyana Moskvina (born 1958), columnist, novelist, journalist, critic, television host
Lena Mukhina (1924–1991), wartime diarist in Leningrad

N
Maria de Naglowska (1883–1936), occultist writer, journalist, translator, wrote in French
Vera Nazarian (born 1966), Armenian-Russian American science fiction novelist
Tsarevna Natalya Alexeyevna of Russia (1673–1716), playwright
Zhanna Nemtsova (born 1984), journalist, social activist
Aleksandra Nikolaenko, writer and winner of the 2017 Russian Booker Prize
Maria Nikolaeva (born 1971), spiritual teacher, religious writer, widely translated

O
Irina Odoyevtseva (1895–1990), poet, novelist, memoirist
Raisa Orlova (1918–1989), literary historian, journalist, latterly in Germany

P
Marina Palei (born 1955), journalist, novelist, short story writer, translator
Avdotya Panaeva (1820–1893), novelist, short story writer, memoirist, salonist
Vera Panova (1905–1973), novelist, playwright, journalist, works translated into English
Sophia Parnok (1885–1933), poet, children's writer, translator
Karolina Pavlova (1807–1893), poet, novelist
Vera Pavlova (born 1963), poet
Olga Perovskaya (1902–1961), children's writer 
Kyra Petrovskaya Wayne (1918–2018), Russian-American non-fiction writer, autobiographer
Maria Petrovykh (1908–1979), poet, translator
Lyudmila Petrushevskaya (born 1938), novelist, playwright, singer
Irina Petrushova (born 1965), journalist, newspaper editor
Anna Politkovskaya (1958–2006), journalist, human rights activist
Elizaveta Polonskaya (1890–1969), poet, translator, journalist
Sofiya Pregel (1894–1972), poet
Maria Prilezhayeva (1903–1989), children's writer, critic, novelist
Rufina Ivanovna Pukhova (1932–2021), memoirist, wife of Kim Philby

R
Rita Rait-Kovaleva (1898–1989), memoirist, translator
Ayn Rand (1905–1982), Russian-born American novelist, philosopher
Maria Rasputin (1898–1977), memoirist
Irina Ratushinskaya (1954–2017), poet, memoirist
Helena Roerich (1879–1955), philosopher, artist, non-fiction writer, letter writer, translator
Yevdokiya Rostopchina (1811–1858), early poet, playwright, translator
Dina Rubina (born 1953), Russian-Israeli novelist, short story writer, essayist
Maria Rybakova (born 1973), short story writer, novelist
Elena Rzhevskaya (1919–2017), Second World War memoirist

S
Irina Saburova (1907–1979), journalist, short story writer, novelist, translator 
Nina Mikhailovna Sadur (born 1950), playwright and prose writer 
Nathalie Sarraute (1900–1999), Russian-French novelist, playwright, memoirist
Tanya Savicheva (1930–1944), Leningrad diarist
Olesya Shmagun (born 1987), investigative journalist
Olga Sedakova (born 1949), poet, translator
Ekaterina Sedia (born 1970), Russian-American fantasy novelist, author of The Alchemy of Stone
Comtesse de Ségur (1799–1874), Russian-French novelist
Yulia Sineokaya (born 1969), philosopher and educator
Marietta Shaginyan (1888–1982), novelist, political activist
Olga Shapir (1850–1916), novelist, feminist
Margarita Sharapova (born 1962), novelist, short story writer, now living in Portugal 
Tatiana Shchepkina-Kupernik (1874–1952), poet, columnist, playwright, translator
Natalia Sheremeteva (1714–1771), early memoirist
Maria Shkapskaya (1891–1952), poet, essayist, journalist
Paullina Simons (born 1963), Russian-American best selling novelist
Olga Slavnikova (born 1957), novelist, critic, author of 2017: A Novel
Esphyr Slobodkina (1908–2002), Russian-American children's writer, illustrator, author of Caps for Sale
Alexandra Smirnova (1809–1882), memoirist
Sofia Soboleva (1840–1884), short story writer, children's writer, journalist
Polyxena Solovyova (1867–1924), Russian poet and translator
Sabina Spielrein (1885–1942), psychoanalyst, scientific writer
Anna Strunsky (1877–1964), Russian-American journalist, novelist, socialist activist, co-authored The Kempton-Wace Letters 
Polina Suslova (1839–1918), short story writer
Alexandra Sviridova (born 1951), screenwriter, television presenter, now living in New York

T
Yelizaveta Tarakhovskaya (1891–1968), poet, playwright, translator, children's writer
Nadezhda Teffi (1872–1952), playwright, short story writer
Fatima Tlisova (born 1966), journalist, now living in the United States
Viktoriya Tokareva (born 1937), screenwriter, short story writer
Natalia Tolstaya (1943–2010), educator, translator, text book writer, writing in Swedish and Russian
Sophia Tolstaya (1844–1919), wife of Leo Tolstoy, diarist, memoirist
Tatyana Tolstaya (born 1951), novelist, essayist, television presenter 
Elsa Triolet (1896–1970), novelist, wrote in Russian and (mainly) French
Marina Tsvetaeva (1892–1941), poet, playwright
Evgenia Tur (1815–1892), novelist, literary critic, children's writer

U
Anya Ulinich (born 1973), novelist, short story writer
Lyudmila Ulitskaya (born 1943), novelist, short story writer

V
Larisa Vaneeva (born 1953), short story writer
Galina Varlamova (1951–2019), Evenk philologist, works in Russian, Evenk and Yakut
Svetlana Vasilenko (born 1956), short story writer, novelist
Marie Vassiltchikov (1917–1978), wartime Berlin diarist
Tatiana Vedenska (born 1976), novelist
Anastasiya Verbitskaya (1861–1928), novelist, playwright, screenwriter, publisher, feminist 
Seda Vermisheva (1932–2020), Armenian-born Russian poet, economist, activist
Lidia Veselitskaya (1857–1936), novelist, short story writer, memoirist, translator
Frida Vigdorova (1915–1965), journalist, novelist
Mariya Vilinska (1833–1907), novelist, short story writer, translator
Zinaida Volkonskaya (1792–1862), poet, short story writer, playwright, salonist
Hava Volovich (1916–2000), memoirist, actress, Gulag survivor
Yekaterina Vorontsova-Dashkova (1743–1810), memoirist
Anna Vyrubova (1884–1964), memoirist

Y
Tatyana Yesenina (1918–1992), novelist, journalist, memoirist
Anna Yevreinova (1844–1919), feminist writer, editor, letter writer, lawyer

Z
Lyubov Zakharchenko (1961–2008), poet, songwriter
Yulia Zhadovskaya (1824–1883), poet, novelist
Vera Zhelikhovskaya (1835–1896), children's writer, novelist
Polina Zherebtsova (born 1985), poet, diarist, author of Ant in a Glass Jar
Maria Zhukova (1805–1855), novelist, short story writer, travel writer 
Valentina Zhuravleva (1933–2004), science fiction novelist, sometimes in collaboration with her husband Genrich Altshuller
Lydia Zinovieva-Annibal (1866–1907), novelist, playwright
Vera Zvyagintseva (1894–1972), actress, poet, translator, memoirist

See also
List of Russian-language writers
List of women writers
Russian literature

References

-
Russian
Writers
Writers, women